Vaseline is an American brand of petroleum jelly-based products owned by transnational company Unilever. Products include plain petroleum jelly and a selection of skin creams, soaps, lotions, cleansers, and deodorants.

In many languages, the word "Vaseline" is used as generic for petroleum jelly; in Portugal, the Unilever products are called Vaselina, and in Brazil and some Spanish-speaking countries, the Unilever products are called Vasenol.

History 

In 1859, Robert Chesebrough, a chemist who formerly clarified kerosene from the oil of sperm whales, traveled to the oil fields in Titusville, Pennsylvania to research what new materials might be created from this new fuel. There he learned of a residue called rod wax that had to be periodically removed from oil rig pumps. The oil workers had been using the substance to heal cuts and burns. Chesebrough took samples of the rod wax back to Brooklyn, extracted the usable petroleum jelly, and began manufacturing a medicinal product he called Vaseline.

The first known reference to the name Vaseline was by Chesebrough in his U.S. patent (U.S. Patent 127,568) in 1872.  "I, Robert Chesebrough, have invented a new and useful product from petroleum which I have named Vaseline..."

The name "vaseline" is said by the manufacturer to be derived from German Wasser "water" + Greek έλαιον (elaion) "oil".

Vaseline was made by the Chesebrough Manufacturing Company until the company, which merged with Pond's in 1955, was purchased by Unilever in 1987.

Uses 

Vaseline can be used as a lubricant for metallic and plastic surfaces. Vaseline should never be used as a lubricant in sexual practices, as it may introduce infection-causing bacteria, damage latex condoms, and is not recommended for internal use. It can also be used as a moisture insulator for local skin conditions characterized by dry skin, such as atopic dermatitis and eczema.

Topical application 
As a petrolatum product, Vaseline is used as a topical moisturizer which assists with skin water retention by acting as an occlusive agent that prevents evaporation of water from the stratum corneum (outermost skin layer) and seals out external water. Vaseline is intended for external use only, and is not recommended for deep skin cuts or punctures, animal bites, or serious burns. Topical petrolatum products like Vaseline are used to manage and relieve atopic dermatitis and eczema in adults.

Vaseline contains mineral oils. Unrefined mineral oils often contain adulterants including polycyclic aromatic hydrocarbons (PAHs), which can increase risk for certain forms of cancer when consumed orally. When used topically (as is recommended with Vaseline), dermal absorption of PAHs is insignificant. No link between topical petroleum jelly-based moisturizers and cancer has been found in large studies over many years.

Ingredient sources 
White petrolatum, the ingredient in petroleum jelly Vaseline, is refined from petroleum. From most to least abundant, the ingredients of Vaseline include: Water (aqua), Glycerin, Stearic Acid, Isopropyl Palmitate, Glycol Stearate, Peg-100 Stearate, Mineral Oil, Dimethicone, Petrolatum, Glyceryl Stearate, Phenoxyethanol, Cetyl Alcohol, Methylparaben, Acrylates/c10-30 Alkyl Acrylate Crosspolymer, Triethanolamine, Propylparaben, and Disodium EDTA.

References

Notes

Citations

External links

 

1872 introductions
Personal care brands
Unilever brands